Bhagwati Prasad may refer to:

 Bhagwati Prasad (politician), Indian politician 
 Bhagwati Prasad (judge), Indian judge